Q87 might be:

 Al-Ala, the 87th surah of the Quran
 
 Intel Q87, an Intel Series 8 chipset